Actibacterium atlanticum is a Gram-negative and non-motile bacterium from the genus of Actibacterium which has been isolated from seawater from the Atlantic Ocean.

References

Rhodobacteraceae
Bacteria described in 2015